The 1903–04 season was the ninth competitive season in Belgian football.

Overview
Only one official division existed at the time, split into two leagues.  It was called Coupe de Championnat (Championship Cup) and its winner was decided after a final round between the first two clubs of each league.  The league A was not completed.

It was also the first competitive season of the now famous Daring Club de Bruxelles.  At the end of the season, one of the new clubs (namely Olympia Club de Bruxelles) withdrew from the league.  It was decided that there will be only one league the next season.

On May 1, 1904, Belgium played its first official match against France at the Stade du Vivier d'Oie, home of the Racing Club de Bruxelles.  This match was viewed by around 1,500 people.

National team
Belgium played its first official game.

* Belgium score given first

Key
 H = Home match
 A = Away match
 F = Friendly

Honour

League standings

Championship Cup A

Championship Cup B

Final round

External links
RSSSF archive - Final tables 1895-2002
Pluto website  - Belgian clubs history